Bamum Scripts and Archives Project at the Bamum Palace is engaged in a variety of initiatives concerning the Bamum script, including collecting and photographing threatened documents, translating and in some cases hand-copying documents, creating a fully usable Bamum computer font for the inventory of documents, and creating a safe environment for the preservation and storage of documents.

See also
Nji Oumarou Nchare

External links
Bamum Scripts and Archives Project

Writing systems of Africa